Rushelle Burton (born 4 December 1997) is a Jamaican hurdler. She competed in the women's 100 metres hurdles at the 2017 World Championships in Athletics.

References

External links

1997 births
Living people
Jamaican female hurdlers
World Athletics Championships athletes for Jamaica
Place of birth missing (living people)
Texas Longhorns women's track and field athletes